Norwood Francis Allman (July 23, 1893 – February 28, 1987) was a China-based American lawyer, consul, newspaperman and judge and also served as a member of the Shanghai Municipal Council from 1940 to 1942. During World War II he served in the OSS in charge of Far East Counter-intelligence and later worked for the CIA.

Early life

Allman was born on 24 July 1893, in Union Hall, Virginia.  Allman attended the University of Virginia for one year before sitting the consular exam.

Consular career in China

Allman was appointed student interpreter in the American legation in Peking in 1915, and served as a consular officer in various locations finally serving as consul in Shanghai from 1921 to 1924.  During that time, he also sat as an assessor (at the time, effectively a co-judge) on the International Mixed Court.

Marriage

Allman married Mary Louise Hamilton on 12 August 1920 in Qingdao.  They had three children.

Shanghai

In 1924, having been admitted to practice before the United States Court for China, Allman retired from consular service and practised law in Shanghai.  He also served as honorary Mexican consul in Shanghai.

He was placed on a Japanese black list because of the paper's editorial policies. In 1940, he was elected a member Shanghai Municipal Council. He was in Hong Kong on business when World War II started and was interned in Stanley Internment Camp.

In 1943, he published a book, Shanghai Lawyer, about his career in China.

After being repatriated, he served in the Office of Strategic Services during the war and continued to work for the CIA after the war.  He returned to Shanghai in 1946 to restart his legal practice and also owned and edited the English language China Press.

Life in America

Allman left China in 1950 and returned to America. He was a broadcaster in America for a number of years.

Death

Allman died on 28 February 1987, in Carlisle, Pennsylvania.

References

External links
 Shanghai Lawyer
 Laura Moorhead – Norwood Allman, the CIA and Representations of Intelligence talk by Laura Moorhead on Allman
 Blog posts on Allman's time in the OSS
 America’s China Spymaster: The life and times of Norwood Allman, Talk by Douglas Clark on Norwood Allman.

20th-century American lawyers
History of Shanghai
People from Franklin County, Virginia
1893 births
1987 deaths
University of Virginia alumni
American expatriates in China